The  is a Confucian temple in the Wakasa district of Naha, Okinawa. It served for centuries as a major center of Chinese learning for the Ryūkyū Kingdom, and contains within its precincts the Meirindō, first public school in Okinawa.

History
The current temple was built in 1975, as a rebuilding of an older temple located a short distance away, near what is now a major highway, Japan National Route 58.

The original temple was built in 1671-75 as a gift to the Ryūkyū Kingdom from the Kangxi Emperor of the Qing Dynasty in China. It served as the primary Confucian temple of the kingdom, and would soon become a center of learning within Kumemura, the community of scholars and bureaucrats which was the center of Chinese culture and learning in the kingdom. In 1718, local official Tei Junsoku, magistrate of Kumemura, and something of an unofficial minister of education, established the Meirindō, the first formal educational institute in the kingdom, as a center of learning for the Kumemura community of scholar-bureaucrats.

Following the abolition of the kingdom and annexation of Okinawa by Japan in 1879, the Kumemura community, along with the Meirindō school and the temple as a whole, fell into decline. The Meirindō became a municipal office and public school under the national education system established under the Meiji government. Historian George Kerr cites a July 1910 newspaper advertisement as the last evidence of public interest in annual ceremonial visits to the temple by those who had lived in the time of the Ryūkyū Kingdom.

The temple was destroyed in the 1945 battle of Okinawa and rebuilt in 1975 on the premises of the Tensonbyō, a smaller Confucian temple in the Wakasa area also destroyed in the battle.

Buildings and monuments
The temple grounds are small, covering roughly one or two acres. The central devotion hall, called Taiseiden (大成殿), is a shrine not only to Confucius, but also to　Chinese philosophers Zengzi, Zisi, Yan Hui, and Mencius.

A smaller building to the left of the entrance, called the Tenson-byō (天尊廟), is devoted to those who fought to defend the country, and to Guan Yu and the Dragon King, Taoist deities and figures in Chinese folklore and mythology. The Tensonbyō was located on this site prior to 1975, when the old Kumemura Confucian temple, destroyed in World War II, was rebuilt here as the Shiseidō, incorporating the Tensonbyō into the new facility. The Tenpigū (天妃宮) next to it is devoted to Tenpi, also called Matsu or Mazu, the Taoist goddess of the sea, of sailors, navigators, and fishermen.

The Meirindō (明倫堂) lies to the right of the entrance, next to the temple offices, and currently serves as the meeting place for the local , and holds an archive of roughly 10,000 volumes ranging from historical documents related to the locality and to foreign trade, to schoolbooks.

Three memorial steles are located within the temple grounds: one to the Chūzan Confucian temple originally established in the 17th century as a gift from the Kangxi Emperor; one to Sai On, historian, government official, reformed, and royal regent at the time the temple was constructed; and one to Tei Junsoku, magistrate of Kumemura and educational force who established the Meirindō as a center of learning.

Notes

Religious buildings and structures completed in 1675
Religious buildings and structures completed in 1975
Confucian temples in Japan
Naha
1945 disestablishments in Japan
1675 establishments in Asia
1718 establishments in Asia
Religious buildings and structures in Okinawa Prefecture
Temples in Japan
Buildings and structures in Japan destroyed during World War II
Rebuilt buildings and structures in Japan
17th-century Confucian temples